Reece Caira is an Australian semi-professional footballer who plays as a left back for Berkeley Vale in the Premier League Central Coast, a regional league within the Australian soccer league system. Caira has previously played professionally as a youth player for Aston Villa and as a senior for Western Sydney Wanderers, Wellington Phoenix and Bonnyrigg White Eagles. In 2017 he played for Valentine Phoenix as a short-term signing to boost their bid for the NSW Finals. Caira has represented the Australia at a number of youth levels and was part of the 2012 AFC U-19 Championship squad that reached the semi-finals of that tournament.

Career
Caira had been part of Premier League team Aston Villa's youth development program before he was recruited to the Western Sydney Wanderers, transferring after one season to the Wellington Phoenix in July 2013.

Personal life
Caira works as a real estate agent in New South Wales alongside his football.

Honours

Club
Western Sydney Wanderers
 A-League Premiership: 2012–13

Bonnyrigg White Eagles
 National Premier Leagues NSW Championship: 2015

See also
 List of Wellington Phoenix FC players
 List of Western Sydney Wanderers FC players

References

External links
 
 

1993 births
Living people
Australian soccer players
Australian expatriate sportspeople in England
Australia under-20 international soccer players
Association football defenders
A-League Men players
National Premier Leagues players
Western Sydney Wanderers FC players
Wellington Phoenix FC players
Bonnyrigg White Eagles FC players
People from Gosford
Sportsmen from New South Wales
Soccer players from New South Wales